Murapara Rajbari is a well known palace in Rupganj Upazila of Narayanganj District, Bangladesh.
The palace is situated in Murapara village, about 25 km southeast of Dhaka on the Narsindghi road. It is connected 5 km stretch of bumpy brick-paved feeder road on the west of main Dhaka- Sylhet trunk road.

History
"Murapara Rajbari" is one of the examples of such activity of an affluent community located in Murapara village, about 25  kilometres southeast of Dhaka on the western side of the Dhaka-Narsingdi road. The Murapara Jomidarbari/Palace was established by the founder of the Murapara Raj family named Ramratan Banerjee. He was appointed as treasurer of the Natore estate and rose to a high position and acquired large properties by dint of his honesty. One source says it was Ramratan Banarjee who constructed the palace in 1889 but the other source says he just established the basement of the structure. It was Protap Chandra Banarjee who left his old traditional house and made new palace behind the old one in 1889.

Architecture
The two-storey picturesque palace is rectangular in plan and has a grand frontage facing west of about 200 feet long. A 10 feet wide verandah runs in front of the palace at both levels, providing access to the rooms.
The depth of the verandah is used as a shading device from the western sun. It has semicircular arches. The areas in the arches are filled with cast iron tracery decorated with green, red and blue glasses, so that the floor of the verandah demonstrates as a colourful mosaic pattern by casting shadow from the sun.

See also
Somapura Mahavihara
Kantajew Temple
Shahbaz Khan Mosque
Shona Mosque
Bagha Mosque
Chawk Mosque
Khan Mohammad Mridha Mosque
Sixty Dome Mosque
Saat Masjid
Lalbagh Fort

References

Palaces in Bangladesh
Narayanganj District